The Once and Future Smash is a 2022 mockumentary film directed by Sophia Cacciola and Michael J. Epstein. The film tells the story of Mikey Smash (Michael St. Michaels) and William Mouth (Bill Weeden), who both played the same football cannibal slasher character, Smash-Mouth, in the 1970 film, End Zone 2.

The film had a world premiere at FrightFest on August 29, 2022. The North American and United States premiere was held at Screamfest on October 19, 2022.

Plot
Longtime rivals, Mikey Smash and William Mouth, each played Smash-Mouth in the 1970 film, End Zone 2. Mikey is credited. William is not. They both attend the Mad Monster Party horror convention when they are promised that it would be their audition to reprise their role as the character in the modern End Zone reboot, which resumes the series one hour into End Zone 2, ignoring the end of the film and the sequels. They are accompanied by their assistant, AJ, son of Randall Browning, who played Smash-Mouth's sidekick AJ in the original 1970 film.

Description
Emilie Black of Cinema Crazed says that, "The Once and Future Smash follows both actors who have been credited as Smash Mouth in End Zone 2 as they go to a convention where fans are awaiting them while mixing in interviews with some of horror industry’s greats. The film mixes these two elements beautifully well, giving the viewer a chance to see how End Zone 2 has impacted those who have seen it and how it became a cult favorite." Moving Pictures Film Club states that the film "crosses into This Is Spinal Tap territory with its farcical and at times surreal portrayal of the lives of the fading stars of retro-grindhouse-slasher movies who were not able to reach the classic cult status of franchises like A Nightmare on Elm Street or Halloween. Mikey (Michael St. Michaels) and William (Bill Weeden) are haplessly hilarious as the two actors behind the cannibal football player Smash Mouth and represent perfectly the rivalry – whether real or imagined – between the different actors behind Hollywood horror icons. There’s also a satirical depiction of the behaviour of production companies that aim to revive horror franchises and completely miss the mark on how to do so with heart. "

The film also references many horror franchises and cult films, sometimes using talking-head interviews with actors involved with those films, a layering that podcast Horror Hangout described as "Wes Craven and beyond levels of meta-narrative."

Cast
Michael St. Michaels	...	Mikey Smash
Bill Weeden	...	William Mouth
A.J. Cutler	...	A.J.
Kevin Allen	...	Jackie J. Jackson
Jeff Ball	...	Security Guard
James Balsamo	...	North Carolina End Zone 2 Fan Club Treasurer / Elvis impersonator
Bethany Boles	...	Judge
Brendan Boogie	...	bartender at the offices of Paul Devine
William L. Bozarth	...	North Carolina End Zone 2 Fan Club Vice President
James Branscome	...	James Branscome
Chris Burke	...	Moist the clown
Julia Cacciola	...	Julie Kane
Sophia Cacciola	...	Sophia Cacciola
Catherine Capozzi	...	Catherine Capozzi
Chris Cartusciello	...	Hotel Concierge / Damn Dirty Ape
Joe Castro	...	Blaze Pauling
Seth Chatfield	...	Detective Frank Dobson (voice)
Sean Clark	...	Marty Thomas
Chloé Cunha	...	Jacques Renault (voice)
Rossella Drudi	...	Rossella Drudi
Tim Dry	...	Seedy Movie Salesman (voice)
John Dugan	...	John Dugan
Vincent Craig Dupree	...	V.C. DuPree
Anastasia Elfman	...	Dahlia Dimont
Richard Elfman	...	Richard Elfman
Bob Elmore	...	Bob Elmore
Michael J. Epstein	...	Repo Man
Todd Farmer	...	Todd Farmer
Claudio Fragasso	...	Claudio Fragasso
Liesel Hanson	...	Patricia Ford
Heidi Honeycutt	...	Heidi Honeycutt
Nick Hunt	...	I Make A Warm Cozy Quilt From Your Skin Fan
Christine Jarrett	...	I Make A Warm Cozy Quilt From Your Skin Fan
Bill Johnson	...	Bill Johnson
Neal Jones	...	Neal Jones
Michael Kallio	...	Mike 'Dilly' Dilworth
Lloyd Kaufman	...	Lloyd Kaufman
Jackie Kelly	...	Edie Sedgwick
Michael Paul King	...	TV News Anchor / Radio News Anchor
Melanie Kinnaman	...	Melanie Kinnaman
Laurene Landon	...	Laurene Landon
Adam Marcus	...	Adam Marcus
Brigid Marshall	...	Snyflan Crump
Eben McGarr	...	Eben McGarr
Victor Miller	...	Victor Miller
Jason Minton	...	Carter the Intern
Kemper Noah	...	Kid with $19
Lianne O'Shea	...	Bernadette Ryan
Loucylle Orren	...	Clown girl
Jazmin Ortiz	...	Boom operator
Gabriel Ospina	...	Ricky
Mark Patton	...	Mark Patton
Ian S. Peterson	...	Topher Brandon
Maiya Reaves	...	Melody Riviera
Joe Ripple	...	North Carolina End Zone 2 Fan Club President
Jared Rivet	...	Jared Rivet
Trista Robinson	...	Percy Wynne
Marc Sheffler	...	Marc Sheffler
Eric Sheslow	...	Repo Man / Jackie's Boss
Jeff Simon	...	Blender manual autograph seeker
Carl Solomon	...	Tex Beckerson / Tex Beckerson Jr.
Jeffrey Stackhouse	...	Paul Devine
Mark Torgl	...	Mark Torgl
Cristian James Watkins	...	Piggy
Dan Yeager	...	Dan Yeager

Production
Rue Morgue notes that the movie was partially filmed at the Mad Monster Party horror convention and the filmmakers described the challenges of the experience: “The convention portion of the movie was one of the most challenging shoots we’ve ever done,” they continue. “Normally we do as much planning as we can, and we have a lot of control over what we shoot, but because it was a live convention, we had to be flexible and ready for anything. This made for some happy surprises, but was also really difficult. For instance, a scene that played out at the official costume contest ended up being a major emotional moment for the actors, but wasn’t even something we knew was going to happen. We shot with multiple cameras and tried our best to cover everything important that was going on.”

Reception
The Once and Future Smash has received mostly positive reviews. Darren Lucas of Movie Reviews 101 describes it as, "one of the smartest comedy documentaries you will see." Upcoming on Screen says, "The Once and Future Smash is an absolute treat for genre fans. With so many wonderful moments carefully laden within the spoof film that you could easily find yourself clapping away at it. Just a joy of a film." Paul Chapinal of Film News notes, "...a beautifully observed and lovingly made spoof by writers and directors Sophia Cacciola and Michael J. Epstein, with Cacciola going before the camera towards the end as the whole thing starts to get out of control. During the film there are snippets of End Zone 2, which has a full run after the main feature. That the filmmakers could get so many horror industry notables in and happy to send themselves up and go along with the flow, says that there’s not a mean bone here."

Actors St. Michaels, Weeden, and Cutler also have received critical praise from critics with AJ Friar of Infamous Horror stating, "There’s great deadpan chemistry between the leads...A.J. Cutler gives a breakout performance in this mockumentary that should get him massive amount of love for being this damn funny and a scene stealer from Michael and Bill." Kim Newman highlights the pair of leads noting, "they both commit wholeheartedly to the roles, with Weeden going further than you’d think in laying himself emotionally and physically bare."

Festivals and awards
FrightFest - August 29, 2022 - London, UK - World Premiere
Screamfest - October 19, 2022 - Los Angeles, CA - North American Premiere
Nightmares Film Festival - October 23, 2022 - Columbus, OH - Midwest Premiere
Morbido Film Festival - Oct 31, 2022 - Mexico City, Mexico
Be Afraid Horror Fest - November 25-27, 2022 - Gorizia, Italy
South Texas Underground Film Festival - Nov 30-Dec 4, 2022 - Corpus Christi, TX
The South African Independent Film Festival - Nov 25-27, 2022 - Capetown/Johannesburg, South Africa 
New York City Horror Film Festival - Dec 1-4, 2022 - New York, NY
Renegade Film Festival - March 2-4, 2023 - Marietta, GA - Winner: Indie Spirit Award

References

External links
 
 

2022 films
2022 horror films
American comedy horror films
2020s English-language films
2020s American films
Absurdist fiction